Krystian Bracik (born 18 March 2001) is a Polish professional footballer who plays as a defender for Ekstraklasa side Cracovia.

References

External links

Living people
2001 births
People from Starachowice
Polish footballers
Association football defenders
MKS Cracovia (football) players
Wisła Puławy players
Ekstraklasa players
II liga players
III liga players